Wiltberger is a German surname. Notable people with the surname include:

August Wiltberger (1850–1928), German classical composer, music director, and professor
Christian Wiltberger (1769–1851), American silversmith
Marc Wiltberger (born 1969), French handball player

German-language surnames